Barton Creek Square is an enclosed shopping mall located in southwest Austin, Texas in the United States, near the intersection of Texas State Highway Loop 1 and Texas State Highway Loop 360. The mall is eponymously named after Barton Creek, Texas. Anchor stores are two Dillard's locations, JCPenney, Macy's, and Nordstrom.

History

The Barton Creek Mall was opened in 1981. The mall was originally anchored by Sears, JCPenney, Montgomery Ward, Foley's, Dillard's, and Austin-based Scarbrough's department store. In November 1981, the mall became the first in Texas to have Braille and bold print signage throughout the center.

A renovation in 2003 added a Nordstrom department store in the place of a Montgomery Ward which had gone out of business two years prior. Further renovations occurred in 2013, which included a redesigned food court.

In 2015, Sears Holdings spun off 235 of its properties, including the Sears at Barton Creek Square, into Seritage Growth Properties. On October 15, 2018, it was announced that the Sears store would be closing as part of a plan to close 142 stores nationwide.

On August 4, 2018, a Disney Junior themed kids zone opened right next to Brighton Collectibles.

In 2019, the mall's owner, Simon Property Group, embarked on a renovation, which included a new paint scheme, flooring, LED lighting, glass handrails, as well as exterior additions such as canopies, fire pits, and turf areas. The renovation also included the addition of a co-working space near Nordstrom, which includes workstations with televisions and charging stations.

On March 17, 2020 the mall limited its hours to 11 am to 7 pm in response to Coronavirus disease 2019; the next day, Simon Property Group announced in a press release it would close all its US domestic malls until March 29. On May 1, 2020, Simon Property Group reopened the mall.

References

External links

Simon Property Group
Shopping malls in Austin, Texas
Shopping malls established in 1980